Assumption United Football Club (Thai สโมสรฟุตบอลอัสสัมชัญ ยูไนเต็ด) is a Thailand semi professional football club based in Bangkok. The club is currently playing in the Thai League 3 Western region.

Stadium and locations

Season by season record

Honours
Khǒr Royal Cup (ถ้วย ข.)
Runner-up : 2010

References

External links
 Official Website
 Official Facebookpage

Association football clubs established in 2011
Football clubs in Thailand
Sport in Bangkok
2011 establishments in Thailand